Antoan Stoyanov (born 17 January 2005) is a Bulgarian footballer who plays as a midfielder for Levski Sofia.

Career statistics

Club

Notes

Honours

Club
Levski Sofia
 Bulgarian Cup (1): 2021–22

References

External links
 
 Profile at LevskiSofia.info
 Profile at Levski Academy

2005 births
Living people
Bulgarian footballers
Bulgaria youth international footballers
Association football midfielders
First Professional Football League (Bulgaria) players
PFC Levski Sofia players
People from Kyustendil
Sportspeople from Kyustendil Province